Susan B. Landau (March 31, 1952 – May 31, 2017) was an American film producer, television producer, talent manager, and photographer whose credits included Mr. Destiny in 1990, Cool Runnings in 1993, An Ideal Husband in 1999, and the 2000 television film, Mary and Rhoda.

Biography
Landau and her twin brother, Paul, were born in Brooklyn, New York, to Sidney Landau, a studio executive at United Artists, and Bea Landau. She attended Springfield Gardens High School in Queens, New York, and received a bachelor's degree political science from Brandeis University in 1974.

She executive produced 1983's Tiger Town, the first television film produced by the Disney Channel, which won a 1984 CableACE Award for Best Dramatic Film, as well as the Walt Disney's Wonderful World of Color: Young Harry Houdini in 1987, which earned her a Primetime Emmy Award nomination for Outstanding Children's Program.

Landau was best known for producing the 1993 comedic film, Cool Runnings, which was loosely based on the Jamaica national bobsleigh team's 1988 Winter Olympics debut. Her other film production credits included Mr. Destiny in 1990, the 1999 documentary Get Bruce, An Ideal Husband in 1999, and All Over the Guy in 2001. She teamed with actress Mary Tyler Moore to co-executive produce the 2000 television film, Mary and Rhoda, based on the 1970s sitcom, The Mary Tyler Moore Show.

In the 1992 California race for U.S. Senate, Landau fundraised on behalf of Senate candidate Barbara Boxer, a Democrat. Boxer, who won the 1992 Senate election, credited Landau with boosting her campaign and her political career, telling an interviewer in 2017, "Susan Landau was a one-of-a-kind and I honestly believe that without her energetic support, I never would have been elected to the Senate in 1992."

Additionally, Landau also worked as a talent manager representing others within the entertainment industry, including screenwriter Simon Beaufoy (writer of Slumdog Millionaire, Salmon Fishing in the Yemen, and The Hunger Games: Catching Fire); actor Dan Bucatinsky (Scandal); director Stephen Surjik (Wayne's World 2), whom she represented for 21 years; and producer Christopher Hollier (The Originals). According to Beaufoy, he and Landau spoke almost daily for 25 years. Hollier praised her abilities as a manager, "there's never been someone more talented at bringing talent out in others. Director, producer, writer – no one could have a better friend in this town."

Landau transitioned to photography beginning in 2007. Her subjects included the Stand Up to Cancer telethon, which had been co-founded by her friend, the late film producer Laura Ziskin. The two had been friends since their work on the set of the 1978 film, Eyes of Laura Mars and Landau later published "Laura Ziskin: Collective Memories & Photographs." Her other subjects included the cast and crew of Showtime's Web Therapy, as well as the producers of five Academy Awards shows. In 2017, Landau published another photo collection, "The Brown Bears of Alaska."

Landau died following a brief illness at Cedars-Sinai Medical Center in Los Angeles on May 31, 2017, at the age of 65. She was survived by her older brothers, Arthur and Avraham, her twin brother, Paul, and four nieces.

Filmography
She was a producer in all films unless otherwise noted.

Film

Miscellaneous crew

As an actress

Thanks

Television

Miscellaneous crew

Camera and electrical department

References

External links

1952 births
2017 deaths
American film producers
Television producers from New York City
American women television producers
CableACE Award winners
Talent managers
American photographers
Brandeis University alumni
People from Brooklyn